Ruben Toledo (born 1961, Havana, Cuba) is a Cuban-American artist based in New York City.

Personal life
Toledo and his wife Isabel met in high school in West New York, New Jersey.

Books
In 1997, Toledo authored Style Dictionary, a collection of drawings and watercolors. He completed his first film, Fashionation, an animated history of French fashion, based on a book of the same name.  Toledo illustrated special edition book jackets for Penguin Classics Deluxe Editions of Jane Eyre, Dracula, The Scarlet Letter, Wuthering Heights, The Picture of Dorian Gray and Pride and Prejudice.

List of titles:

Exhibitions
Ruben Toledo's collaboration with his fashion designer wife, Isabel Toledo, was the subject of both a book and a museum exhibition titled Toledo/Toledo: A Marriage of Art and Fashion at The Museum at the Fashion Institute of Technology.

Awards
Ruben and Isabel Toledo were the recipient of the 2005 Cooper-Hewitt National Design Award for their work in fashion.

References

External links
 
 
 

1961 births
Living people
Businesspeople from New Jersey
American people of Cuban descent
Ballet designers
National Design Award winners
Date of birth missing (living people)